Crown of Fire is a 1994 fantasy novel by Ed Greenwood. It is the second novel in Greenwood's book series, Shandril's Saga, and takes place in the Forgotten Realms setting based on the Dungeons & Dragons fantasy role-playing game.

Plot summary
Shandril, who has risen from being a humble kitchen maid to being one of the most powerful magic users in the Realms, is now hunted by enemies who want to acquire her Spellfire ability.  With her allies, Elminster, the Knights of Myth Drannor, and her lover Narn, she must face the dark magicians of Zhentarim and a group known as the Cult of the Dragon.

Reception
One reviewer described it as "better than its predecessor, but not by much. Arguably stronger writing, more focus in the storytelling and the narrative doesn't drift as much."

Reviews
Kliatt

References

1994 American novels
1994 fantasy novels
Forgotten Realms novels
Novels about orphans
Novels by Ed Greenwood